Finsterwalder GmbH is a German aircraft manufacturer specializing in hang gliders, paragliders and related accessories. The company is headquartered in Munich.

Most of the company's hang glider designs are intended to be folded down to a small size for man-packing up mountains.

Finsterwalder GmbH is made up of two divisions. The headquarters is in Munich and focuses on hang glider design, production and repair along with helmet design and production. Charly Products is located in Seeg and produces paragliders, harnesses and rescue systems.

History
The company was formed in 1974 by Thomas Finsterwalder as a kayak design and production enterprise.

In 1985 the factory and all equipment were destroyed by a fire, delaying production until the following year.

In 1990 the company bought out Charly Products adding paragliders and parachute systems to the company line. Since the take-over the company has done business as Finsterwalder & Charly. In 1994 Charly started a partnership with Nova Paragliders.

Aircraft

References

External links

Aircraft manufacturers of Germany
Hang gliders
Paragliders